Key Largo is an island in the upper Florida Keys archipelago and is the largest section of the keys, at  long. It is one of the northernmost of the Florida Keys in Monroe County, and the northernmost of the keys connected by U.S. Highway 1 (the Overseas Highway). Three census-designated places are on the island of Key Largo: North Key Largo, near the Card Sound Bridge, Key Largo, eight to nine miles from the southern end of the island, and Tavernier, at the southern end of the island.  As of 2010, the three places have a combined population of 13,850. None of Key Largo is an incorporated municipality, so it is governed at the local level by Monroe County.

Key Largo is connected to the mainland in Miami-Dade County by two routes. The first route is the Overseas Highway, the southernmost portion of U.S. Highway 1, which enters Key Largo at Jewfish Creek near the middle of the island and turns southwest. The second route is Card Sound Road, which connects to the northern part of Key Largo at Card Sound Bridge and runs southeastward to connect with County Road 905, which runs southwest and joins U.S. 1 at about mile marker 106. These routes originate at Florida City on the mainland.

Key Largo is a popular tourist destination and calls itself the "Diving Capital of the World" because the living coral reef a few miles offshore attracts thousands of scuba divers and sport-fishing enthusiasts.

Key Largo's proximity to the Everglades also makes it a premier destination for kayakers and ecotourists. Automotive and highway pioneer and Miami Beach developer Carl G. Fisher built the Caribbean Club in 1938 as his last project.

Key Largo is situated between Everglades National Park to the northwest and John Pennekamp Coral Reef State Park to the east, the first underwater park in the United States, which protects part of the Florida Reef, the only living coral barrier reef in the continental United States.

History
When Europeans first arrived in the Florida Keys in the 16th century, the area was uninhabited or only sparsely inhabited by indigenous peoples such as the Calusa and the Tequesta. The earliest description of the area and its inhabitants was by Hernando de Escalante Fontaneda, a survivor of a shipwreck who lived among the Calusa people from 1549 to 1566. The earliest reference to Key Largo is found on a map prepared in 1639 by Dutch cartographer Johannes Vingboons, in which it is named Caio des 12 Leguas (islet of twelve leagues). Some time later, it was named Cayo Largo — meaning long islet — by Spanish explorers.

In 1770, Dutch surveyor Bernard Romans reported that the area was uninhabited, although evidence was found that indigenous people visited the area from time to time. By the end of the Third Seminole War in 1858, the area was under control by the United States government, though it remained largely uninhabited. In 1870, a post office was established at "Caya Largo" (in the current Rock Harbor area). It closed and another was opened called "Largo" in 1881. Additional post offices opened in Planter in 1891 and Aiken in 1895.

The island gained fame as the setting for the 1948 film Key Largo, but apart from background filming used for establishing shots, the film was shot on a Warner Bros. sound stage in Hollywood.  After the film's success, pressure from local businesses resulted in a change in the name of the post office serving the northern part of the island, from "Rock Harbor" to "Key Largo", on June 1, 1952.  After that, every resident north of Tavernier had a Key Largo address and the postmark read "Key Largo".

Geology and geography
The island of Key Largo is an exposed, fossilized remnant of a coral reef formed during a period of higher sea level and then uncovered and eroded during a subsequent ice age.

The island's substrate is called Key Largo limestone; in many places, fossilized corals and smooth, eroded limestone "caprock" are visible at the surface. Solution holes, which are pockets dissolved in the limestone by acidic rainwater, form shallow depressions in the land. The natural shoreline of the island is generally rocky. A slippery, gray, limestone-based clay called "marl" is the shoreline and near-shore soil. No natural sand beaches occur on the island. Inland, decomposed vegetation forms a rich, acidic humus soil up to about 6 in (15 cm) thick, topped by "leaf litter". The soil supports a diverse flora of herbaceous plants, woody shrubs, and hardwood trees.

Climate
Key Largo has a tropical savanna climate (Aw). Frost has never been recorded on the island. Key Largo enjoys close to 3,000 hours of sunshine annually.

References

Further reading

External links

 
 Official Tourism Site

Islands of Monroe County, Florida
Islands of the Florida Keys
Islands of Florida